Matthew Bruenig (born November 22, 1988) is an American lawyer, blogger, policy analyst, commentator, and founder of the left-leaning think tank People's Policy Project. He was a blogger for the American think tank Demos covering politics and public policy and has written on issues including income distribution, taxation, welfare, elections, and the Nordic model.

Career 
Bruenig's writing has appeared in a range of publications including The New York Times, Current Affairs, Jacobin, The Atlantic, Dissent, and The Washington Post.
He has been a featured guest of the politics and humor podcast Chapo Trap House, and appeared on other progressive platforms like the NoFilter of The Young Turks and The Michael Brooks Show.

In 2016, Bruenig was fired from his part-time job blogging for Demos after he posted a series of what Gawker called "rude tweets" targeting first Joan Walsh and later Center for American Progress president Neera Tanden. Demos stated he was let go due to a pattern of "online harassment of people with whom he disagrees"; some journalists nevertheless speculated there may have been outside pressure on behalf of Tanden.

In 2017, Bruenig founded the People's Policy Project, a left-wing think tank which raises money through crowdfunding. The think tank analyzes politics and produces market socialist policy proposals tailored to the United States context.

In 2020, Bloomberg News reported that Bruenig with his wife were producing a podcast that generated about $9,000 per month from listeners.

Personal life 
Bruenig is married to Elizabeth Bruenig, Staff Writer for The Atlantic, formerly an opinion writer and editor at The Washington Post and The New York Times. They have two children.

Bruenig has stated that he was diagnosed as autistic in adulthood.

Political views 
Bruenig describes his brand of socialism as follows:Socialism is the idea that capital (the means of production) should be owned collectively. There are divergent ideas about how to achieve this in reality. One approach is to have the government hold it collectively in social wealth funds. This is (more or less) the socialism of Yanis Varoufakis, Rudolf Meidner, and John E. Roemer. It is also my brand of socialism, at least for the time.Bruenig is an advocate of single-payer healthcare, and has argued extensively in favor of its feasibility.

See also

 Market socialism
 Social welfare model
 Nordic model
 Socialism in the United States

References

External links
 
 People's Policy Project

1988 births
21st-century American lawyers
21st-century American non-fiction writers
American bloggers
American commentators
American economics writers
American labor lawyers
American male bloggers
American political writers
American social democrats
Boston University alumni
Lawyers from Washington, D.C.
Living people
Market socialism
Martin High School (Arlington, Texas) alumni
People on the autism spectrum
University of Oklahoma alumni
Washington, D.C., socialists
Writers from Washington, D.C.